This is a list of films produced in the Telugu film industry in India in 2011.

Box office

Box office releases

January–June releases

July–December releases

Dubbed films

Notable deaths

References

General references
Filmfare Awards 2012 Telugu winners list

2011
Telugu
2011 in Indian cinema